Khoshk Estalkh (also Romanized as Khoshk Esţalkh; also known as Estalkh, Khoseg Estelakh, Khosh Estalkh, Khoshk Eşţakh, Khoshk Estakhr, and Khushkasal’) is a village in Aliabad-e Ziba Kenar Rural District, Lasht-e Nesha District, Rasht County, Gilan Province, Iran. At the 2006 census, its population was 1,168, in 346 families.

References 

Populated places in Rasht County